Joseph Anderson "Ike" Massie (September 24, 1871 – September 24, 1922) was an American football player and coach. He served as the head football coach at Virginia Agricultural and Mechanical College, now known as Virginia Tech, in 1894 and at the University of Virginia in 1898, compiling a career college football record of 10–7. He was later City Attorney of Newport News, Virginia.  He died on his birthday, in 1922.

Head coaching record

References

External links
 

1871 births
1922 deaths
19th-century players of American football
American football guards
Virginia Cavaliers football coaches
Virginia Cavaliers football players
Virginia Tech Hokies football coaches
Sportspeople from Newport News, Virginia
People from Warren County, Virginia
Coaches of American football from Virginia
Players of American football from Virginia